Mordellistena maynei is a species of beetles is the family Mordellidae.

References

maynei
Beetles described in 1854